Hyannis Air Service Inc., operating as Cape Air, is an airline headquartered at Cape Cod Gateway Airport in Hyannis, Massachusetts, United States. It operates scheduled passenger services in the Northeast, the Caribbean, Midwest, and Eastern Montana. Flights between Hyannis and Nantucket, Massachusetts, are operated under the Nantucket Airlines brand, also operated by Hyannis Air Service, Inc. The company slogan is We're your wings.

History 

The airline was co-founded in 1988 by company pilots Craig Stewart and Dan Wolf, and investor Grant Wilson.  Initially, Cape Air flew between Provincetown and Boston in Massachusetts, but throughout the early 1990s new routes were added to destinations across southeastern New England. In 1994, Cape Air and Nantucket Airlines merged and now offer hourly flights between Nantucket and Hyannis. Services in Florida and the Caribbean were added in the late 1990s.

2004 marked the launch year of FAR Part 121 certification and a new hub of operations in Guam. This included a new fleet type consisting of three ATR 42 Turboprop aircraft. The startup team, led by Pacific Administrator, Captain Russell Price, launched scheduled service in July 2004 with the three ATR aircraft and two of the C402. Service was as a Continental Connection Carrier, flying from Guam to the Northern Mariana Islands of Saipan and Rota. Due to the International Dateline and the midnight connecting service to/from Japan, it was sometimes referred to as "America's First Flight" i.e.: the first departure daily of any airline flight in the United States.

In late 2007, the airline began a new round of expansion in the Northeast and Midwest. On 1 November 2007, the airline began service between Boston and Rutland, Vermont, with three daily round trips.  The route is operated under contract with the U.S. government Essential Air Service (EAS) program. With the help of an intrastate minimum revenue guarantee, Cape Air expanded into Indiana on 13 November 2007, offering flights from Indianapolis to Evansville and South Bend. Passenger revenue did not grow quickly enough to make the operation economically sustainable once the revenue guarantee ended, so the last Cape Air flight in Indiana was on 31 August 2008.

The airline expanded into upstate New York in early 2008, following the sudden demise of Delta Connection carrier, Big Sky Airlines. Cape Air began flying three daily round-trips on Essential Air Service routes from Boston to the Adirondack cities of Plattsburgh and Saranac Lake on February 12, 2008. The airline continued its expansion into New York when they started to fly the EAS routes out of Albany to Watertown, Ogdensburg, and Massena, and Rutland Airport. Cape Air commenced service from Rockland, Maine, and Lebanon, New Hampshire, to Boston on November 1, 2008.  The company purchased four additional Cessna 402s to assist with the major growth.

Cape Air was also looking to offer services on the west coast. Cape Air submitted bids to offer service between Newport and Portland in the state of Oregon. The airline was hoping to be selected by the Newport city council to receive a financial grant to jump-start the service. Ultimately they lost out to SeaPort Airlines, which was able to start service sooner than Cape Air. However, in September 2013, the DOT selected Cape Air to provide EAS service between Billings and five communities in Eastern Montana, including, Sidney, Glendive, Glasgow, Havre and Wolf Point. Service in Montana started on December 10, 2013. The airline also expanded operations in the mid-Atlantic region. Cape Air provided scheduled flights from both the Hagerstown Regional Airport and the Lancaster Airport to the Baltimore-Washington International Airport ("BWI"). Service out of Baltimore ended in October 2012.

In May 2013, Cape Air named Linda Markham as the new President and Chief Administrative Officer.

Cape Air carried 750,000 passengers in 2014 and offered up to 550 daily flights, achieving revenues of $120M.
Cape Air is the largest independent regional airline in the United States, with new routes driving steady increases over time.

In 2016, Cape Air started flying from Fort Lauderdale, Florida to Bimini, Bahamas. On April 16, 2018, United Airlines announced the end of its partnership with Cape Air. Services ended on May 31, 2018, which marked the end of United Express operations in Guam, along with the retirement of the last turboprop aircraft in the United Express fleet.

Pilots 
In early 2016 the company had canceled flights citing a shortage of pilots. The Air Line Pilots Association disputed the existence of a pilot shortage instead citing low wages as the reason for the lack of pilots. Cape Air takes on pilots as co-pilots after 500-750h in entry-level roles like instructing.
They are promoted to captain after 1,500h as first officers and they can join partners JetBlue or Spirit Airlines after 1,500h again in around two years.
Cape Air also recruits pilots over 65, the mandatory retirement age for FAR Part 121 airlines, so long as they maintain a first-class medical.

Nantucket Airlines

In 1994 Cape Air merged with Nantucket Airlines. Since then, Nantucket Airlines has operated as a sister airline to Cape Air focusing on flights between Nantucket Memorial Airport and Barnstable Municipal Airport. Nantucket Airlines utilizes a small sub-fleet of Cessna 402C Businessliners/Utililiners painted in Nantucket Airlines livery.

Destinations

Codeshares

JetBlue
Since February 2007, Cape Air and JetBlue Airways have had an interline agreement. The agreement allows Cape Air to carry JetBlue Airways passengers from Boston's Logan Airport and San Juan to Cape Air's destinations throughout the Northeast, Florida and the Caribbean. The agreement allows customers on both airlines to purchase seats on both airlines under one reservation. Customers also get their baggage transferred and Cape Air and JetBlue Airways are located in the same terminal in Boston and San Juan which allows for an easy connection.

American Airlines
Cape Air and American Airlines (AA) announced a code sharing agreement for the Caribbean in February 2013. The cities served by the AA codeshare are Anguilla, Nevis, Tortola, Vieques and Mayaguez. In the Midwest, Cape Air and American have had a code sharing agreement since 2010, which allows passengers from Marion, IL, Owensboro, KY, and Kirksville, MO to connect in St. Louis, MO.

United Airlines 
Cape Air has been a longtime partner with United Airlines (UA) and offers a code sharing agreement for many destinations. Passengers traveling through the Caribbean on select codeshare flights can enjoy special through-fares, advanced boarding passes and the ability to earn miles on a Cape Air flight.

Interline agreements 
Cape Air partners with the following airlines to provide interline flow-through ticketing and baggage transfers:

 Alaska Airlines
 American Airlines
 Condor
 Delta Air Lines
 Hawaiian Airlines
 JetBlue
 Qatar Airways
 United Airlines

Fleet
Cape Air's fleet consists of the following aircraft:

In November 2010, Cape Air announced that it was considering new aircraft types to replace the Cessna 402. In April 2011, Italian aircraft producer Tecnam announced it will be producing the Tecnam P2012 Traveller. The aircraft made its first flight in July 2016. The first aircraft was delivered to Cape Air in March 2019. Cape Air formerly utilized the ATR 42 for United Express operations in Guam. However, when United retired its propeller fleet, the partnership ended between the two airlines. At the 2019 Paris Air Show, Eviation Aircraft announced that Cape Air would add the electric Eviation Alice aircraft to their fleet.

Accidents and incidents

On January 30, 2001, a Cape Air pilot and his only passenger were injured when a Cessna 402C crashed just short of the Martha's Vineyard Airport on a flight from T. F. Green Airport in Warwick, Rhode Island.
On June 12, 2007, Cape Air CEO Daniel Wolf announced the grounding of all of Cape Air's 49 Cessna 402C aircraft nationwide, after three in-flight engine failures. The problem was blamed on premature wear on the crankshaft counterweight. All 402 services were canceled for two days while the counterweights were inspected and replaced as necessary. Normal service resumed about four days after the initial fleet grounding.  The FAA stated that they were monitoring repairs, but that all action taken by Cape Air was voluntary and not ordered by the FAA. "They elected to do the right thing for safety."
On September 26, 2008, a repositioning flight with no passengers on board departed Martha's Vineyard at 8:05 pm en route to Boston. Shortly after takeoff from runway 33, the plane went down about two and a half miles from the airport, killing the pilot, who was the sole occupant. Prior to this date, Cape Air had maintained a fatality-free record over its 18-year history.
On January 22, 2009, a Cape Air 402C with six passengers aboard during a night flight from Key West, FL to Fort Myers, FL lost power in both engines as a result of fuel starvation due to faulty maintenance of the fuel selector. The aircraft made a successful emergency landing at Naples Municipal Airport.
On September 9, 2021, Cape Air Flight 2072, a Cape Air 402C with one crew member and six passengers aboard went down in trees upon landing in Provincetown, coming from Boston. All seven occupants were injured.

References

External links

 
 

Airlines established in 1989
Barnstable, Massachusetts
Companies based in Barnstable, Massachusetts
Martha's Vineyard
Airlines based in Massachusetts
Regional Airline Association members
Regional airlines of the United States
American companies established in 1989
1989 establishments in Massachusetts